The Amityville Harvest is a 2020 supernatural horror film written and directed by Thomas J. Churchill. The film stars Kyle Lowder, Sadie Katz, Brandon Alan Smith and Alexa Pellerin. It is the final Amityville Horror film series in which Ronald DeFeo Jr. served as the real-life mass murderer before his death on March 12, 2021.

Plot 
A documentary crew follows a strange figure with powers.

Cast 
 Kyle Lowder
 Sadie Katz
 Brandon Alan Smith
 Alexa Pellerin
 Johanna Rae
 Michael Cervantes
 Eva Ceja

Release 
The film released on October 20, 2020 on DVD, VOD and Digital.

Reception 
Screen Rant said the twist didn't work because the movie focused on the what instead of why. Common Sense Media calls it a "a bad movie, but it could be a good-bad movie with [...] low expectations." Nightmarish Conjurings said the editing was chaotic and the special effects were poor. Horror Society scored it 1 out of 5. In a more favorable review, Cryptic Rock rated it 3 out of 5.

References

External links 
 
 
 

2020s supernatural horror films
American supernatural horror films
Amityville Horror films
Horror films based on actual events
Demons in film
2020 horror films
Docuhorror films